Jan Grebenc (born 18 August 1992) is a Slovenian handball player who plays for RD Riko Ribnica and the Slovenian national handball team.

He participated at the 2017 World Men's Handball Championship.

References

1992 births
Living people
Slovenian male handball players
Handball players from Ljubljana
Expatriate handball players
Slovenian expatriate sportspeople in Denmark
21st-century Slovenian people
Slovenian expatriate sportspeople in Germany